Óscar Hernández was the winner of tournament in 2009. He chose to defend his title, but he was eliminated by Ivan Sergeyev in the first round.Mikhail Kukushkin won the final against Marcos Daniel. Kukishkin was leading 6–2, 3–0 when Daniel retired.

Seeds

Draw

Finals

Top half

Bottom half

References
Main Draw
Qualifying Singles

Nord LB Open - Singles
Sport in Lower Saxony
2010 Singles